Sleepy Buildings – A Semi Acoustic Evening is a live album by the Dutch rock band The Gathering, released in Europe on 26 January 2004 and in the United States on 9 March 2004 by Century Media Records. The album was recorded at The LUX Theatre in Nijmegen, Netherlands on 22 August 2003. Produced, performed and arranged by The Gathering. Recorded and engineered by Jan Schuurman at 'The Van' Mobile Studio. Mixed by Jan Schuurman, assisted by Wouter Nagtegaal, René Rutten and Frank Boeijen. Mastered by Paul Schuurman at 'The Van' Mastering Studio.

Track listing

Credits 
Anneke van Giersbergen – vocals & acoustic guitar
René Rutten – guitars
Hans Rutten – drums
Hugo Prinsen Geerligs – bass
Frank Boeijen – keyboards & piano

References 

The Gathering (band) albums
2004 live albums
Century Media Records live albums